Cowboy Bebop: The Movie, known in Japan as , is a 2001 Japanese anime science fiction action film based on the 1998 anime series Cowboy Bebop created by Hajime Yatate. Multiple staff from the original series worked on the film, including director Shinichirō Watanabe; writer Keiko Nobumoto; character designer/animation director Toshihiro Kawamoto; and composer Yoko Kanno. Both the original Japanese and English voice cast also reprised their roles.

Cowboy Bebop: The Movie is set between episodes 22 and 23 of the original series. The plot centers on a mysterious terrorist planning to destroy the human population on Mars using an unknown pathogen. The bounty hunter crew of the spaceship Bebop work to find the terrorist and discover the pathogen's source before the attack can take place.

The film was conceived by Watanabe as an extension of his work on the television series, which he treated as a series of miniature films. So as not to alienate fans of the series, a large amount of aesthetic material was incorporated, while also adjusting it to make it accessible to newcomers. Increased budget and production facilities enabled the use of filming styles associated with live action films and a higher animation quality than the series. Arabic thematic elements were incorporated to contrast against the series, which entailed Watanabe traveling to Morocco for research. The Arabic atmosphere was also used in Kanno's music.

The film was produced by studios Sunrise, which had previously developed the original series; Bones, a later studio founded by former Sunrise staff; and Bandai Visual. Cowboy Bebop: The Movie was released to theaters in Japan on September 1, 2001, and in the United States on August 11, 2002. It went on to gross over $3 million worldwide, and when released on DVD, it ranked high on Japanese and US charts. The film received generally positive reviews from mainstream and anime critics, and was nominated for the Online Film Critics Society Award for Best Animated Film.

Plot

On Mars in 2071, it's been 49 years after Earth was mostly abandoned after a catastrophe. Humanity has settled on other planets and moons in the solar system. The film's protagonists are legalized bounty hunters who travel together on the spaceship Bebop. They are Spike Spiegel, a former associate of the Red Dragon crime syndicate; Jet Black, a former police officer and owner of the Bebop; Faye Valentine, a woman who was once a fugitive from bounty hunters; Edward Wong Hau Pepelu Tivrusky IV (Ed for short), a bubbly, energetic girl with genius computer skills; and Ein, an artificially enhanced "data dog" with human-level intelligence. 

Days before Halloween, a man explodes a truck in Mars' capital city, spreading what is assumed to be a new pathogen that kills or sickens over 300 people. In response, the Mars government issues a massive bounty for the culprit's capture. Faye, who was pursuing Lee Sampson, a hacker who was apparently driving the truck, sees the terrorist and the Bebop crew decide to take on the bounty. Each follows different lines of inquiry. Ed, using a tattoo on the attacker's wrist, manages to identify him as Vincent Volaju, a former member of a military squad apparently killed in the Titan War. In reality, Vincent was the only survivor of a test involving the pathogen, having been immunized with a test vaccine: left with dissociative amnesia and hallucinations of glowing butterflies, his inability to tell dreams from reality eventually drove him insane.

Jet learns that the truck was the property of Cherious Medical Pharmaceutical Company, who illegally manufactured the pathogen as a biological weapon. Looking for information on the pathogen, Spike is given a sample by a man named Rashid, who was the former lead on its development. Spike also encounters Elektra Ovilo, an agent of Cherious Medical. Upon examination, the "pathogen" proves to be a type of protein-based nanomachine that mimics human lymphocytes then breaks down into protein after death, making it undetectable. Attempting to infiltrate Cherious Medical, Spike fights with Elektra, planting a listening device on her. Elektra, who is sent by Cherious Medical to kill Vincent, is tailed by Spike, who attempts to take down Vincent on a train.

Vincent easily defeats Spike, severely wounding him and throwing him from the train before releasing another cloud of the nanomachines: everyone in the train dies except Elektra, who was unknowingly immunized when she had been in a relationship with Vincent prior to the test on Titan. Elektra secretly gives a friend in the company a sample of her blood to prepare a stock of vaccine. During this time, Faye relocates Sampson, who has been working with Vincent, but fails to catch him. Ein and Ed manage to find him again, but the two run off before Faye can get there. She arrives just as Vincent breaks one of the nanomachine containers with him, killing Sampson. Although Faye is also infected, Vincent gives her some of his blood through a kiss, immunizing her. 

After Spike recovers and has a final talk with Rashid, he and Elektra are captured by Cherious Medical, who want to suppress all knowledge of the nanomachines' existence. The two escape from Cherious Medical, grabbing the newly produced vaccine on the way. In turn, Faye escapes after Vincent goes to trigger an attack on the city that will eventually kill everyone on Mars. After the group reunites, it is determined that Vincent will spread the nanomachines by exploding the giant jack-o'-lantern balloons used in the Halloween parade. Jet has a troop of old crop dusters spread the vaccine over the city while Faye heads for the weather control center and causes it to rain on the city, aiding the spread of the vaccine. 

Spike and Elektra separately head to confront Vincent. Spike arrives first and the two battle to a standstill, then the nanomachines are released and Spike is temporarily weakened by them (before he gets cured with the vaccine). As Vincent prepares to kill Spike, Elektra arrives and shoots Vincent. Having wanted to die since Titan, Vincent does not defend himself and thanks Elektra for their time together before dying.

Voice cast

Development

Cowboy Bebop: The Movie was first announced in September 1999: the majority of the series' staff were carried over along with Watanabe, including producer Masahiko Minami, character designer/animation director Toshihiro Kawamoto, and writer Keiko Nobumoto. The original Japanese cast also returned. The writing process was finished and production began in July 2000. It was produced by the studios Sunrise, Bones and Bandai Visual. While Sunrise worked on the original series, Bones was founded in 1998 after the series' completion by Minami, Kawamoto and Hiroshi Ōsaka. The length of the film's production allowed the team to ensure its high quality.

The idea for a film was in the mind of director Shinichirō Watanabe during the development of the original Cowboy Bebop series, which he had originally envisioned as a film. Watanabe treated each episode of the series as a miniature film, so to progress onto a feature-length film seemed natural to him. So as not to disappoint fans, the film incorporated as much of the series as possible while making it accessible to newcomers. He had thought up some of the story and the character of Vincent during the production of the series. After the series ended and there was demand for a continuation from both fans and sponsors so the decision was made by the series creators to make a film. Watanabe said "When the original 26-episode series concluded, a lot of fans and sponsors wanted me to continue. That's why I made this movie."

Watanabe was aiming towards a live-action look for the film despite its medium, using camera tricks, visual effects and character expression impossible in the series while keeping "the Bebop flavor". According to Kōichi Yamadera, the Japanese voice actor for Spike, the only real changes made by the team in the portrayal were to show off the characters, including Spike, in different ways: Spike, in particular, displayed more of his inner thoughts and showed a gentler side than he did in the series, as there was more time available to express such details. Watanabe personally chose the voice actors for Elektra and Vincent. Vincent was partially intended as a type of villain that could not be done in the series, even though Watanabe felt he was not "particularly unique".

Because of increased running time, budget and facilities, the team were able to include more cels in animations, as well as longer and more intricate action sequences. The film included difficult sequences that Watanabe could not do along with the rest of the film, so two guest directors were brought in for them: Hiroyuki Okiura, who handled the opening sequence, and Tensai Okamura, who created a cinematic Western shown at a drive-in theater during the film. Watanabe wanted to give the film an Arabic feel, in contrast to the series which often used New York and Hong Kong for inspiration. To this end, Watanabe went on a research trip to Morocco. The character Rashid was based on the guide who had shown the research team round the city. Working on the film was different for Watanabe when compared to the series in a positive way: while he had to put the entire story in a twenty-minute episode for the series, the team were able to create a longer, more detailed narrative.

Music

The music for Cowboy Bebop: The Movie was composed by Yoko Kanno, composer for the original series, and performed by her band Seatbelts. She used the same mixture of music genres (western, opera, jazz) as with the TV series, but also added Arabic elements in keeping with the film's thematic feel. She used Arabic and English for the music lyrics. Alongside these, the soundtrack made use of a large number of rock instruments. Five tracks from the film were released on the Seatbelts mini-album Ask DNA, released on July 25, 2001. The soundtrack's official release, Cowboy Bebop: Knockin' on Heaven's Door OST Future Blues, was released on August 22, 2001. Both these albums were reissued in December 2012.

Release
Cowboy Bebop: The Movie was first released in cinemas in Japan on September 1, 2001. After the film's international release, this date was subject to debate in the western fanbase due to its proximity to the September 11 attacks. It was first shown to the west at the 2002 AnimeCon, where it was announced that the original English cast would reprise their roles. Its Japanese subtitle, "Knockin' on Heaven's Door", was changed for the western release due to sharing its name with the 1973 Bob Dylan song of the same name. Instead of creating a new subtitle, the team settled with using "The Movie", though a November 2018 rerelease of the film by Funimation features the original subtitle. It was jointly released in the United States by Sony Pictures through their Destination Films label and Samuel Goldwyn Films and internationally by Tristar Pictures. During its initial screening at the event, it sold out completely, prompting a second screening later in the event. The film received a limited theatrical release in the United States, opening on April 4, 2003. During its opening weekend, it reached 19th place in the box office chart, bringing in $12,338 per screening. The film's total gross in America was $1,000,045. Its worldwide gross totals $3,007,903.

The film was released on DVD in Japan on February 7, 2002, immediately reaching the top of the DVD/VHS charts. Sunrise and Bandai Visual underestimated the possible sales, with the first print being used up soon after release, prompting a second print for mid-February. Columbia TriStar Home Entertainment released it on DVD in the United States on June 24, 2003. In 2006, it was ranked as the sixth best-selling anime DVD in the United States. It did not receive a theatrical release in the United Kingdom, instead being released as a direct-to-DVD feature. It was released in the UK on June 27, 2003. The film was later released on Blu-ray disc in Japan on July 25, 2008. It was released in North America by Image Entertainment on June 28, 2011.

In celebration for the series's 20th anniversary in 2018, the film was shown in United States theaters by Funimation Films on August 15 (with Japanese audio and English subtitles) and on August 16 (with the English dub).

Critical response
On review aggregator Rotten Tomatoes, the film has an approval rating of 66% based on 76 reviews, with an average rating of 6.30/10. The website's critical consensus reads, "This may be strictly for anime junkies, but they'll find much to like about Cowboy Bebops casual violence and cool dialogue." On Metacritic, the film has a weighted average score of 61 out of 100, based on 23 critics, indicating "generally positive reviews". The film was nominated at the Online Film Critics Society Awards 2003 in the Best Animated Film category, though it lost the award to Finding Nemo. Helen McCarthy in 500 Essential Anime Movies praised the music of the movie, calling it "the show's secret weapon", and stated that "the movie's only real fault is that it's about half an hour too long".

Critic reviews have generally been positive. Andy Patrizio of IGN gave the film a score of 9 of 10, saying that the developers "did a superb job of fleshing out the story", as well as praising it for "not succumbing to melodrama like many of its live-action counterparts". He also commented that the film's subject matter of terrorism in the face of the September 11 attacks "smacked way too close to home". The music also received praise. Mike Crandol of Anime News Network echoed many of these sentiments. His main criticism stemmed from the fact that Jet, Faye and Ed were relegated to supporting roles, and that it was difficult getting them all into the story. He also said that the team had outdone themselves with the animation quality in a few scenes, such as the final fight between Spike and Vincent. Robert Koehler of Variety, reviewing an undubbed subtitled release, praised the visuals and writing, although he found some sections a little long. Charles Solomon writing in the Los Angeles Times however praised the film for its running time, saying it gave screenwriter Keiko Nobumoto time to explore the characters.

Other reviews were more mixed. Lawrence van Gelder of The New York Times gave the film a mixed review, saying that he enjoyed the experience, but found it a little frivolous when compared to both its subject matter and events at the time. His ultimate impression from the English-dubbed version was that the film could easily have been set in present-day New York. Peter Bradshaw writing in The Guardian gave the film 2 out of 5 stars and praised the film's visuals, but said that the plot wasn't very interesting and failed to keep him interested. Jamie Russell, writing for the BBC, gave it 4 out of 5 stars, saying it was "good enough to deserve mention in the same breath as Akira, Ghost in the Shell, and Spirited Away". The most praise went to the use of live-action camera angles. Though he found the film's story sometimes slowed noticeably, the soundtrack and visual references to other notable action films made it "an example of anime at its very best." Other newspapers of the time including the Toronto Star, Chicago Tribune and generally shared opinions with other reviewers: several praised the plot and animation, while others were mixed. Others, including the Toronto Star and Newark Star-Ledger, noted its connection to science fiction films.

References

External links

 
 
 
 
 
 

2001 science fiction action films
2001 anime films
2001 films
2000s Western (genre) science fiction films
Action anime and manga
Animated action films
Animated films based on animated series
Bandai Visual
Bioterrorism in fiction
Bones (studio)
Movie
Existentialist films
Films about amnesia
Films about terrorism
Films directed by Shinichirō Watanabe
Films set in 2071
Films set in the 2070s
Films set on spacecraft
Japanese Western (genre) science fiction films
Japanese animated science fiction films
Japanese films about Halloween
2000s Japanese-language films
Japanese neo-noir films
Japanese science fiction action films
Mars in film
Post-traumatic stress disorder in fiction
Space Western films